Randall Einhorn (born December 7, 1963) is an American television cinematographer, director, and producer, best known for his work on The Office, Wilfred, It's Always Sunny in Philadelphia, and Survivor.

Early life and career
Born in Cincinnati, Ohio, Einhorn graduated from Finneytown High School in 1982.

Einhorn began his career in the late 1990s, working sporadically as [[director]] and cinematographer on several different projects including Fear Factor, Eco-Challenge, and Survivor, for which Einhorn was nominated for two Emmy Awards.

Einhorn is best known for his work as cinematographer and occasional director on The Office. He also directed The Accountants, a ten-part webisode spin-off of The Office which appeared online between the second and third seasons. In tribute to Randall's contribution to the series, the Season 6 episode of The Office, The Cover-Up, was dedicated to Larry Einhorn, Randall's father, who died on April 20, 2010. Randall also plays the role of CFO of Dunder Mifflin, until he resigns in Season 2, Episode 2 of "The Office"

Between 2009 and 2011, while still working on The Office, Einhorn took on the roles of producer and director for 14 episodes of ''It's Always Sunny in Philadelphia. He went on to direct several episodes of Parks and Recreation and Fargo, and produce and direct for Nurse Jackie and all but three episodes of Wilfred.

In May 2015, it was announced that Einhorn would be the executive producer and director of The Muppets, executive produced and co-created by Bill Prady (co-creator, The Big Bang Theory) and Bob Kushell (Anger Management, 3rd Rock from the Sun, The Simpsons). The show was cancelled after one season.

Since working on The Muppets, Einhorn has continued to produce and direct for various comic film and television projects, including The Mick and The Kids Are Alright. Recently, he and his Sad Unicorn production company inked a multi-year, first-look deal with Warner Bros. Television.

He is now an executive producer and a director on ABC's Abbott Elementary.

He is sometimes known mononymously as RANDALL, rendered in all capital letters.

In March 2023, it was announced that Einhorn will direct upcoming ABC comedy pilot Public Defenders'', starring Anthony Anderson.

Select directing filmography 

 2012-2013, Nurse Jackie, TV Series, 7 episodes
 2014, Wilfred, TV Series, 46 episodes
 2015, Death Pact, TV movie
 2015, The Red Road, TV Series, 4 episodes
 2015, The Muppets : First Look Presentation, short
 2015, Fargo, TV series, 3 episodes
 2015-2016, The Muppets, TV series, 13 episodes
 2017, The Mick, TV series, 1 episode
 2017, Me, Myself and I, TV series, 1 episode
 2018, Lodge 49, TV series, 3 episodes
 2018-2019, Kids Are Alright, TV series, 8 episodes
 2020, Gumshoe, TV movie
 2020, Prospect, TV movie
2021-2023, Abbot Elementary, TV series, 12 episodes

References

External links
 
 

1963 births
American television directors
Living people